Kirbyville High School is a public high school in Kirbyville, Texas, United States and classified as a 2A school by the UIL.  It is part of the Kirbyville Consolidated Independent School District which is located in central Jasper County.  In 2015, the school was rated "Met Standard" by the Texas Education Agency.

Athletics
The Kirbyville Wildcats compete in these sports - 

Volleyball, Cross Country, Football, Basketball, Powerlifting, Golf, Tennis, Track, Baseball & Softball

State Titles
Boys Basketball - 
1968(2A)
Softball - 
2003(3A)

State Finalist
Football - 
2008(2A) 
2009(2A)
Baseball - 
2019(3A)

External links
 Kirbyville ISD

References

Schools in Jasper County, Texas
Public high schools in Texas